The North West Ambulance Service NHS Trust (NWAS) is the ambulance service for North West England. It is one of ten ambulance trusts providing England with Emergency medical services, and is part of the National Health Service, receiving direct government funding for its role.

NWAS was formed on 1 July 2006, following the merger of four previous services (Cumbria Ambulance Service; Lancashire Ambulance Service; Cheshire and Mersey Ambulance Service; and Greater Manchester Ambulance Service) as part of Health Minister Lord Warner's plans to combine ambulance services.

NWAS provides emergency ambulance response via the 999 system, as well as operating the NHS 111 advice service for North West England.

They also operate non-emergency patient transport services (PTS) for part of the region, and in 2013/2014 carried out 1.2million such journeys. Since 2016, the PTS in Cheshire, Warrington and Wirral has instead been carried out by West Midlands Ambulance Service.

Fleet 

NWAS utilise a mixed fleet of emergency and patient transport ambulances. The trust uses rapid response cars, and since 2017 have begun using BMW i3 electric cars In Central Manchester, some paramedics respond on specially converted bicycles.

Locations and structure 
The trust currently operates from 104 ambulance stations across the North West. The most northerly station is at Carlisle, and the furthest south is at Crewe. It also maintains three Emergency Operations Centres (EOCs) for the handling of 999 calls and dispatch of emergency ambulances.

 Parkway (Manchester Area)
 Estuary Point (Cheshire and Mersey Area) – formerly Elm House
 Broughton (Cumbria and Lancashire Area)

In 2017, NWAS signed an agreement to purchase a new EOC and area office for £2.9million at Liverpool International Business Park next to Liverpool John Lennon Airport , this building has been converted and services have now migrated from the Anfield site.

Over recent years, the trust has combined many of their older ambulance stations into purpose-built facilities shared with other emergency services, including Greater Manchester Fire and Rescue, Lancashire Fire and Rescue and Greater Manchester Police.

Performance 
NWAS was the first ambulance trust to be inspected by the Care Quality Commission (CQC), in August 2014. The CQC found the trust provided safe and effective services which were well-led and with a clear focus on quality but it was criticised for taking too many callers to hospital and for sending ambulances when other responses would have been more appropriate. The trust was subsequently inspected in 2018 and was found to have improved with a rating of "Good"

CQC performance rating
In its last inspection of the service in February 2020, the Care Quality Commission (CQC) gave the following ratings on a scale of outstanding (the service is performing exceptionally well), good (the service is performing well and meeting our expectations), requires improvement (the service isn't performing as well as it should) and inadequate (the service is performing badly):

See also
 Emergency medical services in the United Kingdom
 Healthcare in Cheshire
 Healthcare in Cumbria
 Healthcare in Greater Manchester
 Healthcare in Lancashire
 Healthcare in Merseyside
 North West Air Ambulance
 List of NHS trusts

References

External links 

 
 Inspection reports from the Care Quality Commission

2006 establishments in England
Government agencies established in 2006
Health in Merseyside
Health in Greater Manchester
NHS ambulance services trusts
Health in Lancashire
Health in Cumbria
Ambulance services in England